Yasbolagh (also Romanized as Yāsbolāgh; also known as Ās Būlāq) is a village in Esfandan Rural District, in the Central District of Komijan County, Markazi Province, Iran. At the 2006 census, its population was 903, in 220 families.

References 

Populated places in Komijan County